Frank Schöbel (born 11 December 1942, Leipzig, Saxony, Germany) is a German musician. He was one of the most successful pop singers in socialist East Germany (GDR), and has continued to perform even after German reunification.

Career
As the second son of an opera singer, his early musical talent was discovered. He started his career in the GDR as a musician, but also appeared as a presenter and entertainer in TV shows and played in DEFA (GDR-state film production company) films.

In 1971, he recorded "Wie ein Stern" (Like a Star), which appeared in the acclaimed 2007 film The Lives of Others. This single was a smash hit in East Germany, selling 400,000 records from East Germany's Amiga, and 150,000 from the West German record company Philips.  Schöbel was invited as the first East German pop singer to appear in West Germany.  He also had a hit in 1975 his children's Communist-sympathizing album We Paint a Sun, with, among other things, a song about Tokei-ihto. He sang the album's title song in 2005 with Lars Dietrich.

Schöbel joined at the opening ceremony of the 1974 FIFA World Cup in West Germany as a representative of the GDR in the Frankfurter Waldstadion.

Frank Schöbel was married to the actress and singer Chris Doerk, with whom he often performed in the 1960s and 1970s, and later to Aurora Lacasa.

From the first marriage, he had a son, Alexander, and from the second marriage daughters Dominique (who's today a successful singer) and Odette.  Together with his former wife Aurora and the two daughters, he took the LP family Weihnachten in Familie in one of the most important and best-selling albums of Christmas music of the GDR.

Schöbel continues to perform live, often with his ex-wife Chris Doerk.

Films
 Reise ins Ehebett (1966)
 Hochzeitsnacht im Regen (1967)
 Hot Summer (1968)
 Nicht schummeln, Liebling! (1972)
 Drei reizende Schwestern: Familienfest mit Folgen (1984, TV series)
 In aller Freundschaft (2007, TV series guest star)

External links
 Official Website
 

1942 births
Living people
Musicians from Leipzig
East German musicians
20th-century German musicians
German-language singers
German male singers
German pop singers
Recipients of the National Prize of East Germany
20th-century German male musicians